"On the Lam" is a song by Kele Okereke, lead singer and rhythm guitarist of the band Bloc Party, released as the third single from his debut solo album The Boxer. The music video was released on October 8, 2010, with the digital EP being released on October 25.

Music video
The song's music video was released on October 8, 2010 to Kele's official YouTube channel. As of November 6, 2011, the video has 176,278 views.

Track listings

References

2010 songs
2010 singles
UK garage songs
Kele Okereke songs
Songs written by Kele Okereke
Wichita Recordings singles